The Tatra Baghira was a dune buggy designed by Czechoslovakian designer, Václav Král in the 1970s, who also built the vehicle.  The structure of the car was used in various vehicles, and aircraft parts. Chassis and body were built by Král aided by a team of industry enthusiasts.  The first car was built in 1970.  The name Baghira came from the name of the black panther in Rudyard Kipling's The Jungle Book (1894).

References

Off-road vehicles
Sports cars
Baghira